Convair, previously Consolidated Vultee, was an American aircraft manufacturing company that later expanded into rockets and spacecraft. The company was formed in 1943 by the merger of Consolidated Aircraft and Vultee Aircraft. In 1953, it was purchased by General Dynamics, and operated as their Convair Division for most of its corporate history.

Convair is best known for its military aircraft; it produced aircraft such as the Convair B-36 Peacemaker and Convair B-58 Hustler strategic bombers, and the Convair F-102 Delta Dagger and Convair F-106 Delta Dart interceptors. It also manufactured the first Atlas rockets, including the rockets that were used for the crewed orbital flights of Project Mercury. The company's subsequent Atlas-Centaur design continued this success and derivatives of the design remain in use as of 2023.

The company also entered the jet airliner business with its Convair 880 and Convair 990 designs. These were smaller than contemporary aircraft like the Boeing 707 and Douglas DC-8, but somewhat faster than both. This combination of features failed to find a profitable niche and the company exited the airliner design business. However, the manufacturing capability built up for these projects proved very profitable and the company became a major subcontractor for airliner fuselages.

In 1994, most of the company's divisions were sold by General Dynamics to McDonnell Douglas and Lockheed, with the remaining components deactivated in 1996.

History

Origins 
Consolidated produced important aircraft in the early years of World War II, especially the B-24 Liberator heavy bomber and the PBY Catalina seaplane for the U.S. armed forces and their allies. The Catalina remained in production through May 1945, and more than 4,000 were built. What was soon called "Convair" (first unofficially, and then officially), was created in 1943 by the merger of the Consolidated Aircraft Company and the Vultee Aircraft Company. This merger produced a large airplane company, ranked fourth among United States corporations by value of wartime production contracts, higher than the giants Douglas Aircraft, Boeing, and Lockheed. Convair always had most of its research, design, and manufacturing operations in San Diego County in Southern California, though surrounding counties participated as well, mostly as contractors to Convair.

Jet Age, Cold War, and Space Age 
In March 1953, all of the Convair company was bought by the General Dynamics Corporation, a conglomerate of military and high-technology companies, and it became officially the Convair Division within General Dynamics.

After the beginning of the Jet Age of military fighters and bombers, Convair was a pioneer of the delta-winged aircraft design, along with the French Dassault aircraft company, which designed and built the Mirage fighter planes.

One of Convair's most famous products was the ten-engined Convair B-36 strategic bomber, burning four turbojets and turning six pusher propellers driven by Pratt & Whitney R-4360 Wasp Major radial piston engines. The Convair B-36 was the largest landbased piston engined bomber in the world. The Atlas missile, the F-102 Delta Dagger and F-106 Delta Dart delta-winged interceptors, and the delta-winged B-58 Hustler supersonic intercontinental nuclear bomber were all Convair products. For a period of time in the 1960s, Convair manufactured its own line of jet commercial airliners, the Convair 880 and Convair 990 Coronado, but this did not turn out to be profitable. However, Convair found that it was profitable to be an aviation subcontractor and manufacture large subsections of airliners — such as fuselages — for the larger airliner companies, McDonnell Douglas, Boeing, and Lockheed. 

In the 1950s, Convair shifted money and effort to its missile and rocket projects, producing the Terrier missile ship-launched surface-to-air system for the U.S. Navy during the 1960s and 1970s. Convair's Atlas rocket was originally developed in 1957 as an ICBM for the U.S. Air Force. It was replaced in 1962 by the room-temperature liquid-fueled Titan II missile and the solid-fueled Minuteman missile. The Atlas rocket transitioned into a civilian launch vehicle and was used for the first orbital crewed U.S. space flights during Project Mercury in 1962 and 1963.

The Atlas rocket became a very reliable booster for launching of satellites and continued to evolve, remaining in use into the 21st century, when combined with the Centaur upper stage to form the Atlas-Centaur launch vehicle for launching geosynchronous communication satellites and space probes. The Centaur rocket was also designed, developed, and produced by Convair, and it was the first widely used outer space rocket to use the all-cryogenic fuel-oxidizer combination of liquid hydrogen and liquid oxygen. The use of this liquid hydrogen – liquid oxygen combination in the Centaur was an important direct precursor to the use of the same fuel-oxidizer combination in the Saturn S-II second stage and the Saturn S-IVB third stage of the gigantic Saturn V moon rocket of the Apollo program. The S-IVB had earlier also been used as the second stage of the smaller Saturn IB rocket, such as the one used to launch Apollo 7. The Centaur upper stage was first designed and developed for launching the Surveyor lunar landers, beginning in 1966, to augment the delta-V of the Atlas rockets and give them enough payload capability to deliver the required mass of the Surveyors to the Moon.

More than 100 Convair-produced Atlas-Centaur rockets (including those with their successor designations) were used to successfully launch over 100 satellites, and among their many other outer-space missions, they launched the Pioneer 10 and Pioneer 11 space probes, the first two to be launched on trajectories that carried them out of the Solar System.

In addition to aircraft, missiles, and space vehicles, Convair developed the large Charactron vacuum tubes, a form of cathode-ray tube (CRT) computer display with a shaped mask to form characters, and to give an example of a minor product, the CORDIC algorithms, which is widely used today to calculate trigonometric functions in calculators, field-programmable gate arrays, and other small electronic systems.

Dissolution 
General Dynamics announced the sale of the Missile Systems Division segment of Convair to Hughes Aircraft Company in May 1992 and the Space Systems Division segment to Martin Marietta in 1994. In July 1994, General Dynamics and McDonnell Douglas mutually agreed to terminate Convair's contract to provide fuselages for the 300-seat MD-11 airliner. Manufacturing responsibility was to be transferred to McDonnell Douglas, which said it would not preserve the operation in San Diego. General Dynamics had tried for two years to sell the Aircraft structures segment of Convair unit, but the effort ultimately failed.

The termination of the contract meant the end of the Convair Division and of General Dynamics' presence in San Diego, as well as the city's long aircraft-building tradition. The defense contractor once employed 18,000 people there but after selling its divisions, that number is now zero. General Dynamics closed its complex in Kearny Mesa, demolishing the facility between 1994 and 1996. Homes and offices now occupy the site. The Lindbergh Field plant that produced B-24s during World War II was also demolished and the consolidated rental car facility now occupies this space.

The Fort Worth, Texas factory, constructed to build the B-24s, and its associated engineering locations and laboratories — all previously used to make hundreds of Consolidated B-24s, General Dynamics F-111 Aardvark fighter-bombers and General Dynamics F-16 Fighting Falcons, along with dozens of smaller projects — were sold, along with all intellectual property and the legal rights to the products designed and built within, to the Lockheed Corporation. In 1996, General Dynamics deactivated all of the remaining legal entities of the Convair Division.

Timeline 

 1923 Consolidated Aircraft Corporation formed by Major Reuben H. Fleet
 1934 AVCO acquired the Airplane Development Corporation from Cord and formed the Aviation Manufacturing Corporation (AMC)
 1936 AMC liquidated to form the Vultee Aircraft Division, an autonomous subsidiary of AVCO
 1939 Vultee Aircraft Division of AVCO reorganized as an independent company known as Vultee Aircraft, Inc.
 1941 Consolidated Aircraft Corporation sold to AVCO
 1943 Consolidated-Vultee, formed by the merger of Consolidated Aircraft and Vultee Aircraft; still controlled by AVCO
 1947 Convair acquired by the Atlas Corporation
 1953-1954 Convair acquired by General Dynamics
 1985 General Dynamics formed their "Space Systems Division" from the Convair Space Program
 1992 Missile Systems Division sold to Hughes Aircraft Company
 1993 The Fort Worth facility sold to Lockheed Corporation
 1994 Space Systems Division sold to Martin Marietta (now Lockheed Martin)
 1994 Convair Aircraft Structures unit sold to McDonnell Douglas (now Boeing)

Products

Aircraft

Missiles and rockets 
 RTV-A-2 Hiroc (1946) – high-altitude rocket
 SAM-N-2 Lark (late 1940s) – surface-to-air naval missile
 MX-774 (1948) – precursor to Atlas
 XSM-74 (1950s) – decoy cruise missile
 RIM-2 Terrier (1951) – surface-to-air naval missile
 RIM-24 Tartar (1962) – surface-to-air naval missile
 XGAM-71 Buck Duck (1955) – decoy missile
 Sky Scorcher (1956) – proposed air-to-air missile
 Pye Wacket (1957) – air-to-air defensive missile project, cancelled during development
 FIM-43 Redeye (1960) – man-portable surface-to-air missile
 Atlas (rocket family) (1959) The Atlas civilian space booster
 Atlas E/F
 Atlas G
 Atlas H
 Atlas LV-3B
 Atlas SLV-3
 Atlas-Able
 Atlas-Agena
 SM-65 Atlas – The Atlas ICBM Air Force missile (1957)
 Convair X-11 and SM-65A Atlas (1957) – Atlas A prototype
 Convair X-12 and SM-65B Atlas (1958 – Atlas B prototype
 SM-65C Atlas
 SM-65D Atlas
 SM-65E Atlas
 SM-65F Atlas
 Atlas-Centaur (1962) and its successor-designations, all of which combined an Atlas booster with a centaur upper stage – a civilian rocket to launch spacecraft to outer space.
 Centaur (1962)
 BGM-109 Tomahawk long-range, all-weather, subsonic cruise missile.
 AGM-129 Advanced Cruise Missile (1983) – stealthy, nuclear, air-launched cruise missile

References

Notes

Bibliography

External links 

 Aerospacelegacyfoundation.org
 Abcdlist.nl: Complete production list of Convairliners
 Employee newspaper, Convairiety, at the Fort Worth Public Library Archives.

Aerospace companies of the United States
Defunct aircraft manufacturers of the United States
Manufacturing companies based in California
Technology companies based in San Diego
Companies based in San Diego County, California
Manufacturing companies established in 1943
Technology companies established in 1943
1943 establishments in California
Manufacturing companies disestablished in 1996
Defunct companies based in California
General Dynamics
1953 mergers and acquisitions
Lockheed Corporation
McDonnell Douglas mergers and acquisitions
American companies established in 1943
Defunct technology companies based in California